Hungarobatrachus (meaning "Hungarian frog") is an extinct genus of advanced frog, which lived during the upper Cretaceous period (Santonian age) in what is now Hungary. It was described in 2010 from isolated ilia and tibio-fibulae recovered from the Iharkút locality in the Csehbánya Formation. This genus was named by Zoltán Szentesi and Márton Venczel in 2010, and the type species is Hungarobatrachus szukacsi. While originally interpreted as a member of Ranoidea, a later study based on new ilia and skull bones found it to be a member of Hyloidea instead.

References

Cretaceous frogs
Fossil taxa described in 2010
Late Cretaceous amphibians
Cretaceous amphibians of Europe